Heinolan Peliitat (formerly Heinolan Kiekko) is an ice hockey club based in Heinola, Finland. The club is made up of 11 teams with the top team playing in the Mestis.  They play their home games in the Versowood Areena, which has a capacity of 2,975 (with 1,500 seated). The club is affiliated with the Liiga side Lahti Pelicans.

Retired numbers
 #16 - Marko Nyman
 #19 - Vesa Welling
 #27 - Steven MacDonald

Peliitat Greats
 Tim Army
 John Donnelly
 Marko Ek
 Donald Fraser
 Niko Hovinen
 Jani Keinänen
 Kurt Kleinendorst
 Ville-Matti Koponen
 Steve MacDonald
 Lauri Mononen
 Erkki Mäkelä
 Juha Ovaska
 Seppo Repo
 Karri Rämö
 Janne Sinkkonen
 Antti Tyrväinen

References

Sport in Heinola
Ice hockey teams in Finland
Ice hockey clubs established in 1984
1984 establishments in Finland